Tang King Shing  was the Commissioner of the Hong Kong Police force until 11 January 2011.

Tang has been appointed as Chairman of the Country and Marine Parks Board for the period 1 September 2013 to 31 August 2015.

Biography
Tang joined the Royal Hong Kong Police in 1976 as a Probationary Inspector. Prior to his promotion to a Superintendent in 1986, he served in divisions such as the Police Tactical Unit and the Special Duties Unit.

Tang was promoted in 1992 to Senior Superintendent and posted as District Commander Airport, Chief Superintendent Special Duty for the 1997 Handover of Sovereignty Ceremonies, District Commander of Mongkok District, as well as Deputy Regional Commander of Hong Kong Island Region. Between 1991 and 1993, Tang was seconded to the London Metropolitan Police under the Superintendent Exchange Scheme and performed the role of a Divisional Superintendent.

Tang then became Assistant Commissioner of Police (ACP) in 1999, Senior Assistant Commissioner of Police in March 2002, Deputy Commissioner of Police in December 2003, and as Deputy Commissioner of Police (Operations) took over responsibility for all aspects of the operational policing of the Force. On 16 January 2007, he succeeded Lee Ming-Kwai as the Commissioner of Police.

Studies
1989 – Intermediate Command Course at the Bramshill Police Staff College, UK
1995 – Henley Management Course, UK
1998 – China Studies Course at the Tsinghua University, Beijing
1999 – Royal College of Defence Studies, UK
2003 – Advanced National Studies Programme at China National School of Administration, Beijing
2006 – FBI National Executive Institute

Awards
1978 – The Best Team of PTU
1994 – Colonial Police Long Service Medal
1997 – Hong Kong Police Long Service Medal
1998 – Hong Kong Police Medal for Meritorious Service (PMSM)
2001 – Hong Kong Police Long Service Medal First Clasps
2004 – Hong Kong Police Medal for Distinguished Service (PDSM)
2006 – Chief Executive's Commendation for Government/Public Service
2007 – Bramshill International Leadership in Policing Award, National Policing Improvement Agency

References

1954 births
Living people
Government officials of Hong Kong
Hong Kong civil servants
Hong Kong Police commissioners
Members of the National Committee of the Chinese People's Political Consultative Conference
Hong Kong people of Hakka descent
HNA Group people
Members of the 13th Chinese People's Political Consultative Conference